Henry Mervyn Storey (20 November 1913 – 13 July 1977) was an Australian rules footballer who played with Essendon in the Victorian Football League (VFL).

Notes

External links 
		

1913 births
1977 deaths
Australian rules footballers from Western Australia
Essendon Football Club players